Thomas Sandford was an American soldier and politician.

Thomas Sandford may also refer to:

Thomas Sandford (MP) for Carlisle in 1597
Thomas Sandford (MP for Westmorland), 14th-century MP and father of Robert Sandford (died 1403/1404)
Sir Thomas Sandford, 1st Baronet  (died c. 1655) of the Sandford baronets, elected to Cockermouth constituency